Tantow is a municipality in the Uckermark district, in Brandenburg, Germany.

Demography

References

Localities in Uckermark (district)